The first season of M*A*S*H aired Sundays at 8:00–8:30 pm on CBS.

Cast
The following six actors were listed in the opening credits:

The first season of M*A*S*H also had a very large number of recurring characters:

Characters marked with the symbol '‡' were seen only during the first season, and were written out of the show without explanation.

Episodes

Footnotes

See also

 List of M*A*S*H episodes

References
Books

 
 

Web site

Notes

External links 
 List of M*A*S*H (season 1) episodes at the Internet Movie Database

1972 American television seasons
1973 American television seasons
MASH 01